Jason Paul Sutton, OBE, is a Royal Air Force Regiment officer who was appointed Officer of the Order of the British Empire for his actions whilst serving in Iraq in 2007.

Sutton was born in Reading, Berkshire in 1966 and joined the RAF Regiment in 1989 after completing Initial Officer Training at RAF College Cranwell.

He served as a junior officer on No. 20 Sqn RAF Regiment and No. 3 Sqn RAF Regiment, and as Station Regiment Officer at RAF Cranwell.  He has been Officer Commanding on the Junior Regiment Officers' Course at RAF Honington and Second-in-Command of The Queen's Colour Squadron.

Promoted to squadron leader in 2001, he was SO2 in the RAF Ceremonial Office whilst it was based at RAF Bentley Priory.  Whilst in the Ceremonial Office, Sutton was involved in organising ceremonial occasions including the unveiling of the Battle of Britain Monument in London, Service of Thanksgiving and Rededication on Battle of Britain Sunday, Annual Church Service of the RAF, 80th Anniversary of the Royal Auxiliary Air Force, Memorial Service for HRH Princess Alice, the Duchess of Gloucester the RAF element to the Lord Mayor's Show and the RAF element at all the Remembrance weekend events, including Royal British Legion Festival of Remembrance.

Sutton then assumed command of No. 1 Sqn RAF Regiment in March 2006. He has served on operations in Northern Ireland, Georgia, East Timor, Afghanistan and Iraq.

His citation reads:

Sutton was promoted to wing commander in the Operational Support Branch of the RAF on 1 July 2008.

References

Background to Al Wake Battle
Presentation of OBE
Picture of Sutton showing his medals
YouTube video of No. 1 Sqn RAF Regt in Iraq, featuring Sutton describing the Al Wake Battle

Officers of the Order of the British Empire
Royal Air Force officers
Graduates of the Royal Air Force College Cranwell
People from Watford
Royal Air Force personnel of the War in Afghanistan (2001–2021)
Royal Air Force personnel of the Iraq War
Living people
1966 births